El Sayed Salem (born 10 July 1987) is an Egyptian footballer who plays for Al Ittihad as a left back.

References

External links
El Sayed Salem at Footballdatabase

1987 births
Living people
People from Sharqia Governorate
Egyptian footballers
Egyptian Premier League players
Association football defenders
Ghazl El Mahalla SC players
Ala'ab Damanhour SC players
Wadi Degla SC players
Al Ittihad Alexandria Club players